Malaysia competed in the 2010 Asian Beach Games held in Muscat, Oman from 8 to 16 December 2010.

Medallists

References

Malaysia
2010 in Malaysian sport